The 1902 Turkestan earthquake (also known as the Artux/Artush and Kashgar earthquake) devastated Xinjiang, China, near the Kyrgyzstan border. It occurred on August 22, 1902, at about 8:00 or 9:00 am local time with an epicenter near the Tien Shan mountains. The Tien Shan mountains is situated in a zone of complex convergence caused by the Indian–Eurasian plate interaction. This zone is actively deforming—accommodated by active thrust faults responsible for seismic activity. The mainshock was preceded by an intense series of foreshocks in the years prior. Many aftershocks followed, several were larger than magnitude 6.0 and one measured magnitude 6.8–7.3. These aftershocks were recorded for three years. Additional shocks were recorded over a decade after the mainshock. An estimated 5,650–10,000 people were killed in the mainshock. Widespread destruction occurred—at least 30,000 homes were destroyed. The effects of the earthquake led government officials to relieve victims of taxes and provide compensation.

Tectonic setting 
The Pamir–Tien Shan region is situated in a broad deformation zone caused by the ongoing collision of the Indian Plate with the Eurasian Plate. This deformation led to the formation of the Tien Shan mountains. Its formation began in two stages during the Paleozoic era—first (southern Tien Shan) in the Late Devonian–early Carboniferous and later (northern Tien Shan) in the late Carboniferous–early Permian. Before the Indian subcontinent collided with Eurasia, there were island arcs and microcontinents (terranes) between the two landmasses. These terranes were later accreted to Eurasia as the northward-moving Indian subcontinent collided, and are now in present-day Central Asia. The collision of terranes and island arcs as well as the collision with Eurasia eventually formed the Tien Shan mountains. Ancient suture zones mark the boundary where these collisions took place. The region is dominated by large, north and south dipping thrust faults along the southern edge of the Tien Shan mountains, and the northern boundary of the Tarim Basin. The Tien Shan actively accommodates crustal shortening by underthrusting of the Tarim Basin in the south and overthrusting of the Pamirs in the west southwest. Most of the /year shortening is accommodated along its southern boundary.

Earthquake 

The mainshock was recorded on seismographs across Europe. It was also instrumentally recorded in Cape Town, Toronto, Irkutsk, and Christchurch. It is the largest and earliest instrumentally recorded earthquake in the Tien Shan region. It was previously thought that the seismic magnitude exceeded 8, such as Chinese earthquake catalogs that placed the surface-wave magnitude at 8.25 (written as 8). Due to the sparse network of seismic instruments to record the mainshock, its magnitude was greatly overestimated. The epicenter was also relocated further east from previous determinations.

Characteristics
Scientific knowledge of the earthquake was limited due to the period when it happened. Academic research into the event has spanned nearly 40 years, but due to the inaccessible location, understanding its characteristics remains a challenge. Strike-slip and thrust faulting have been suggested as the mechanism of this earthquake. The lack of an agreement on its source is due to the complex tectonic setting.

The Ttiotegongbaizi–Aerpaleike Fault (TAF) located at the southern flanks of the Tien Shan range, near the western part of the larger Kalpin fold and thrust belt, was postulated as the source fault. It dips to the north at varying angles of 25° to 60°. For a magnitude 7.7 earthquake, a  rupture is needed, and the dimensions of the TAF suggest it is large enough to be the source. The fault is within area with the highest seismic intensity based on observations. Thrust faulting was also indicated by the earthquake's focal mechanism, further supporting the theory. Field observations along the TAF found no trace of surface ruptures indicating the event was a blind thrust earthquake. The same fault system was responsible for the 1996  6.9 earthquake which killed 26 people.

Also proposed was a steep-dipping left-lateral strike-slip boundary fault inferred to be the source. The proposed fault marks the boundary between the southwestern Tian Shan and northern Tarim basin. However, no surface deformation supports the existence of strike-slip deformation in the area. Moreover, reflection seismology does not support the existence of fault with such a characteristic in the area.

Scientists also proposed that the earthquake was the result of two thrust faults rupturing in succession of each other. Two sub-parallel surface ruptures trending north–northeast were identified and attributed to the earthquake. These faults located at the base of the Tien Shan and are exposed at the base of anticlines. These south-dipping faults displayed recent thrust faulting activity and thrust-related folds.

Effects

In Xinjiang, it was felt in Yining, Ürümqi, Korla, Taxkorgan and Hotan. It had a maximum intensity of X on the Modified Mercalli, Rossi–Forel, and Medvedev–Sponheuer–Karnik scales. Shaking occurred in an east–west direction at the southern base of the Tien Shan. Isoseismal IX covered , extending east–west from Wuqia to Karaqi. It was felt as far south in Kashgar, Shule, Shufu and Jiashi. Isoseismal VIII was felt in Kangsu, Toyun, Uqturpan, and Akto. It was also felt strongly in the counties of Yopurga, Kalpin, Yengisar and Maralbexi.

Foreshocks

Seismicity in the area prior to the mainshock had been relatively high. Multiple earthquakes of ~ 6.0 occurred, however, a large  seismic gap existed. Historical records of earthquakes date back up to 10 years before 1902. In 1892, an  6.3 event struck southeast of the 1902 mainshock. After a  7.5 earthquake struck Tashkorgan in 1895, seismicity progressed north towards Atushi. The city was affected by a destructive earthquake ( 6.0+) once every year from 1896 to 1898. This high rate of seismicity ceased from 1899 and leading to the mainshock. Between 10 and 20 days before the mainshock, an estimated magnitude 3.1 tremor was recorded at Upal.

Aftershocks
Severe aftershocks were felt every day up till August 30. There were at least 16 aftershocks with a recorded magnitude of 4.7 or greater from 1902 to 1926—eight were recorded within a month after the mainshock. The first recorded aftershock measuring  6.1 occurred at 23:00 on August 22. Several aftershocks registered magnitude 6.0 or greater in the following years. A  6.8 or 7.3 aftershock occurred on August 30 with an epicenter  from that of the mainshock. There were relatively few aftershocks recorded in 1905. This decrease in activity may have been related to the large Tien Shan earthquakes of December 1906 and January 1911. However, it was also possible that these earthquakes were simply unrecorded. Strong earthquakes continued to rock the mainshock area for years—a  5.8 in 1916,  6.5 in 1919, and two  5.0+ in 1920.

Precursor activity

There were unusual noises, peculiar animal behaviors, lights and a change in the weather prior to the mainshock. In Ahu, two hours before the earthquake, cattle, horses, chickens, dogs, cats and other livestock made unusual sounds. In areas which would eventually experience intense (VIII–IX) shaking, animals were running, flying or barking. Loud sounds emitted from the ground and was heard in Maralbexi. The sounds were described as similar to thunder, an airplane or gun blasts. In Artux, it was heard from the west, while at Shule, it was heard from the north. Lights were observed at Jiashi, Shufu, Artux and other places within the meizoseismal area. At Jiashi, these were described as "fire" and "lightning". At Shufu, a meteor-like fireball was observed. The weather was unusually windy and rainy—there was also hail shortly before the mainshock struck.

Impact 

The earthquake produced strong shaking for 1.5 minutes. Between 5,650 and 10,000 people were killed and more than 30,000 homes collapsed. An additional 600 livestock including sheep, cattle, camels, and donkeys died. In Ahu, all houses with the exception of one located on bedrock collapsed. More than 300 were killed in the township—about 20 percent of its population. The earthquake triggered massive landslides with an estimated volume exceeding .

In the meizoseismal area, trees swayed in a forceful manner such that their tips touched the ground. Some trees were uprooted or snapped. Many tents were affected. Ground slumping near a riverbank blocked roads and dammed streams. Water gushed out from many of the large fissures. Five hundred people died in the area. Many domesticated animals were also killed. Old springs dried up while new ones formed.

In Kashgar, sun-dried brick walls and homes collapsed. Masonry buildings did not sustain serious damage. Numerous fissures opened in the northern entrance of the city, where the city walls had toppled. Several historical monuments including the Xiangfei Tomb partially collapsed and fractured. At least 667 people died and thousands more were injured in Kashgar. In Artux, north of Kashgar, the earthquake collapsed nearly every home. Between 5,000 and 6,000 were killed in Artux. The Artux Grand Mosque, the first of its kind in Xinjiang, toppled. Up to half its city walls fell. At least 400 people perished in the village of Astyn, while in Jangi, 20 were killed. In Yarkand, damage was lighter but two children died from toppled walls. Damage was reported in Naryn and At-Bashy but there were no fatalities.

Valleys collapsed and many river channels were blocked, creating waterfalls and new springs. Most earth-constructed homes were destroyed in Songtak, and more than 50 people were killed. At Üstün Atux, 90 percent of its housing stock were destroyed. Several people died in Halajun. Forty deaths were recorded in Upal and the township lost 20 percent of its homes. A death toll exceeding 30 was recorded at Baykurut.

Aftermath
Some villages spent four days burying dead bodies in the wake of the disaster. The Qing dynasty government provided pensions and tax exemptions for the victims. Recorded in Volume 566 of the Qing Shilu (Veritable Records of Qing), the Governor of Gansu and Xinjiang, Rao Yingqi, ordered an investigative committee to evaluate the situation and provide compensation. Guangxu Emperor also issued an edict for tax exemptions.

See also 
 List of earthquakes in 1902
 List of earthquakes in China
 List of earthquakes in Kyrgyzstan

References 

Sources

External links
 
 U.S. Geological Survey event page

1902 earthquakes
1902 natural disasters
1902 in China
Earthquakes in Kyrgyzstan
1902 in the Russian Empire
Buried rupture earthquakes
Earthquakes in Xinjiang
Earthquakes in China
Kashgar
Tian Shan
20th century in Xinjiang
Landslides in China
China–Kyrgyzstan border
1902 disasters in Asia
1902 disasters in China
1902 disasters in the Russian Empire